The Splityard Creek Dam is a rock and earth-fill embankment dam with an un-gated spillway across the Pryde Creek that is located in the South East region of  Queensland, Australia. The sole purpose of the dam is for the generation of hydroelectricity. The impounded reservoir is called the Splityard Creek Reservoir.

Location and features

Construction commenced in 1977 and was completed in 1980 by contractors Thiess Brothers and John Holland. The  dam wall holds back the  reservoir when at full capacity. Transferred to CleanCo Queensland in October 2019.

Power station

Owned by CleanCo Queensland and operated by CS Energy, Wivenhoe Power Station is located on the eastern side of Wivenhoe Dam, north west of Brisbane. The station, which began commercial operation in 1984, was Queensland's first pumped-storage hydro-electric plant. It is operated remotely from an operating centre used to manage the Queensland electricity grid.

The dam's water capacity is enough for the power station to run at full load for approximately ten hours. Using both pumps, this water can be replaced in about 14 hours. The pumped storage power station consists of two circular concrete silos, each of about  internal diameter.

Recreation
Public access including swimming is banned from the dam due to strong currents and submerged hazards.

See also

List of dams in Queensland
Wivenhoe Dam
Wivenhoe Power Station

References

External links

CS Energy

Reservoirs in Queensland
Buildings and structures in Somerset Region
Dams in Queensland
Dams completed in 1980
Energy infrastructure completed in 1980
1980 establishments in Australia
Embankment dams
Rock-filled dams
Earth-filled dams